Patricia Piper Golden is the 16th circuit court judge in Kane County, Illinois
. She is up for re-election in 2008.

References

External links
 Campaign Site

Living people
American women judges
Year of birth missing (living people)
21st-century American women